Serafin Wiestner (born 20 July 1990) is a Swiss biathlete.

He competed in the 2014 Winter Olympics for Switzerland where he finished 40th in the sprint.

Biathlon results
All results are sourced from the International Biathlon Union.

Olympic Games
0 medals

*The mixed relay was added as an event in 2014.

World Championships
0 medals

*During Olympic seasons competitions are only held for those events not included in the Olympic program.
**The mixed relay was added as an event in 2005.

References

External links 
Sochi Olympic Profile

1990 births
Biathletes at the 2014 Winter Olympics
Biathletes at the 2018 Winter Olympics
Living people
Olympic biathletes of Switzerland
Swiss male biathletes
People from Surselva District